Year 1462 (MCDLXII) was a common year starting on Friday (link will display the full calendar) of the Julian calendar.

Events 
 January–December 
 March 27 – Ivan III of Russia becomes the ruler of Russia, following the death of his father, Vasili.
 June 17 – The Night Attack: Vlad III Dracula attempts to assassinate Mehmed II, forcing him to retreat from Wallachia.
 June 30 – Battle of Seckenheim: Frederick I, Elector Palatine is victorious over four other opponents.
 July 22 – The first siege of Chilia by Stephen the Great fails, and he is seriously wounded.
 September 17 – Thirteen Years' War – Battle of Świecino (Battle of Żarnowiec): The Kingdom of Poland defeats the Teutonic Order.
 September – Siege of Mytilene: Mehmed II captures the town of Mytilene, thus conquering the island of Lesbos.
 December – After Radu III the Fair takes over the throne in Wallachia, Vlad III Dracula seeks help in Transylvannia, where he is captured by Mathias Corvinus, and imprisoned for the next 12 years, over false charges of treason.

 Date unknown 
 The Jews are expelled from Mainz, Germany.
 Portugal begins to settle the Cape Verde Islands, with slaves from the coast of Guinea.
 War of the Roses – Battle of Piltown: The Yorkists defeat the Lancastrians, in the Lordship of Ireland.

Births 
 January 2 – Piero di Cosimo, Italian artist (d. 1522)
 January 8 – Walraven II van Brederode, Dutch noble (d. 1531)
 February 1 – Johannes Trithemius, German scholar and cryptographer (d. 1516)
 February 21 – Joanna la Beltraneja, princess of Castile (d. 1530)
 May 19 – Baccio D'Agnolo, Italian woodcarver, sculptor and architect (d. 1543)
 May 31 – Philipp II, Count of Hanau-Lichtenberg (1489–1503) (d. 1504)
 June 27 – Louis XII of France, King of France (1498–1515), King of Naples (1501–1504) (d. 1515)
 July 21 – Queen Jeonghyeon, Korean royal consort (d. 1530)
 September 8 – Henry Medwall, first known English vernacular dramatist (d. 1501)
 September 16 – Pietro Pomponazzi, Italian philosopher (d. 1525)
 September 26 – Engelbert, Count of Nevers, younger son of John I (d. 1506)
 November 26 – Alexander, Count Palatine of Zweibrücken and Count of Veldenz (1489–1514) (d. 1514)
 date unknown
 Jodocus Badius, Flemish printer (d. 1535)
 probable – Edmund Dudley, minister of Henry VII of England (d. 1510)

Deaths 
 February 23 – Thomas Tuddenham, English landowner (b. 1401)
 February 26 – John de Vere, 12th Earl of Oxford (b. 1408)
 February 27 – Władysław II of Płock, Polish noble (b. 1448)
 March 27 – Vasily II of Moscow, Grand Prince of Moscow (b. 1415)
 March 31 – Isidore II of Constantinople, Ecumenical Patriarch of Constantinople
 April 26 – William Percy, medieval Bishop of Carlisle (b. 1428)
April 28 – Ulrich II. of Rosenberg, Czech noble and politic (b. January 13 1403)
 August 26 – Catherine Zaccaria, Despotess of the Morea
 September 17 – Anna of Saxony, Landgravine of Hesse, German royalty (b. 1420)
 November 11 – Anne of Cyprus, Italian noble (b. 1418)
 November 13 – Anne of Austria, Landgravine of Thuringia, consort of William III, Landgrave of Thuringia (b. 1432)
 November 25 – John Stourton, 1st Baron Stourton, English baron (b. 1400)
 date unknown
 King Esen Buqa II of Moghulistan  
 Niccolò Gattilusio, last Prince of Lesbos
 Dài Jìn, Chinese painter (b. 1388)

References